Szarlej is a hamlet in Kuyavian-Pomeranian Voivodeship, Poland located in the Gmina Kruszwica, Inowrocław County. In March 2011, it was inhabited by 256 people.

History 
In the 14th century, Szarlej was an important settlement in the Duchy of Gniewkowo. In 1343, as the previous capital of the state, Gniewkowo, got burned down during the Polish–Teutonic War, Szarlej became the seat of the duke, and therefore, de facto capital of the state.

References

Bibliography 
 Władysław Biały. Ostatni Książę Kujawski by Józef Śliwiński. Kraków. 2017. ISBN 978-83-7730-250-7.
Villages in Inowrocław County